This article reports production, consumption, exports and imports of electricity by country. Dependent territories, not fully recognized countries and supranational entities are not ranked. By default countries are ranked by their total electricity production. All data is taken from CIA World Factbook.

List

See also
List of countries by electricity production
List of countries by electricity consumption
List of countries by electricity exports
List of countries by electricity imports

General:
List of countries with mains power plugs, voltages and frequencies
Electricity consumption
Electricity generation

References

Electric markets
Markets
Country